Sharyinsky District is an administrative and municipal district (raion), one of the twenty-four in Kostroma Oblast, Russia. It is located in the southeast of the oblast. Its administrative center is the town of Sharya (which is not administratively a part of the district). Population:  12,851 (2002 Census);

Administrative and municipal status
Within the framework of administrative divisions, Sharyinsky District is one of the twenty-four in the oblast. The town of Sharya serves as its administrative center, despite being incorporated separately as a town of oblast significance—an administrative unit with the status equal to that of the districts.

As a municipal division, the district is incorporated as Sharyinsky Municipal District. The town of oblast significance of Sharya is incorporated separately from the district as Sharya Urban Okrug.

References

Notes

Sources



Districts of Kostroma Oblast